Prunus vachuschtii is a species of plum known by the common name in . It is native to the Caucasus region.

Uses

In Georgia, it is eaten in hand and is used to make tkemali, a tart sauce for meat dishes. Although it is probably conspecific with Prunus cerasifera, the cherry plum (in ), Georgians distinguish the two botanically and culinarily. In the Caucasus, P. vachuschtii tends to be found from Caspian sea level up to 500–700m and P. cerasifera tends to be found at higher elevations, up to 1600–1800m.

Classification
N. N. Bregadze, who was apparently quite the splitter, described the species in 1976, and identified three forms; Prunus vachuschtii f. imeretinea, P. v. f. meczibuche, and P. v. f. vachuschtii.

See also 
 List of plum dishes

References 

vachuschtii
vachuschtii
Flora of the Caucasus
Plants described in 1976